Robert Norman Smith ( 1965 –  July 22, 2020) was a Canadian actor who was known as Rob Smith in his earlier works.

Criminal charges
In 2008, Smith pleaded guilty to two charges of possessing and one charge of distributing child sexual abuse material. He received a 20-month prison sentence. In June of 2020 he was charged with an additional two counts of distributing child sexual abuse material and three counts each of possessing and accessing child sexual abuse material.

Discovery of dead body
His body was found in Minden Lake, Ontario, on July 25, 2020, after he was reported missing three days earlier. No foul play was suspected.

Filmography

Film roles
1999: Bob in Pushing Tin
1999: Forensic man in Resurrection
2000: Buzzed in CyberWorld
2002: Newspaper photographer in Chicago
2004: Santa Claus in Saint Ralph
2005: Reporter in Cinderella Man
2005: David in King's Ransom
2007: John Baker in King of Sorrow

Television roles
1993: Male character in Beyond Reality
2003: Detective Anderson in 1-800-Missing
2004: Boxcar in Cold Squad
2004: Dan Malone in Doc
2005: Dr. Tony Lewis in Kojak
2005: Joe Gaskins in Kevin Hill
2006: Scottish spokesman for Alexander Keith's

Voice acting roles
1998-2000: Teisel Bonne in the Mega Man Legends series
1998-2003: Spot, Space Dog, and TV Announcer in Rolie Polie Olie
1999: Freddie the Frog in Little People: Big Discoveries
1999-2002: Coach Rhineheart in Angela Anaconda
2002: Spot and Space Dog in Rolie Polie Olie ("The Great Defender of Fun", "The Baby Bot Chase", and "The Search for Spot")
2003: Various roles in the English dub of Air Master
2003-2006: Goliath in JoJo's Circus
2004-2010: Various roles in Franny's Feet
2004-2008: Holley in Miss Spider's Sunny Patch Friends
2007: Various roles in Friends and Heroes
2008: Jacques LaRock in Chilly Beach ("The World Is Hot Enough" and "The Canadian President")

See also
Robert Cecil Smith, a live-action actor
Robert O. Smith, a voice actor

References

External links

1965 births
2020 deaths
Canadian male film actors
Canadian male television actors
Canadian male video game actors
Canadian male voice actors
Canadian people convicted of child pornography offenses
20th-century Canadian male actors
21st-century Canadian male actors
Place of birth missing
2020 suicides
Suicides by drowning in Canada
Suicides in Ontario